Heaven on Earth is a 1927 American drama silent film directed by Phil Rosen and written by Harvey Gates. The film stars Renée Adorée, Conrad Nagel, Gwen Lee, Julia Swayne Gordon, Marcia Manon and Pat Hartigan. The film was released on March 5, 1927, by Metro-Goldwyn-Mayer.

Cast 
Renée Adorée as Marcelle
Conrad Nagel as Edmond Durand
Gwen Lee as Claire
Julia Swayne Gordon as Aunt Emilie
Marcia Manon as Aunt Jeanne
Pat Hartigan as Anton

References

External links 
 

1927 films
1920s English-language films
Silent American drama films
1927 drama films
Metro-Goldwyn-Mayer films
Films directed by Phil Rosen
American black-and-white films
American silent feature films
1920s American films